Steven Goldstein is a Colombian racing driver.

Racing career
In 2004 he won the Sportsman Division of the Formula Dodge Eastern Race Series in the United States. In 2005 he won a Panoz GT Summer Series race.

In 2006 he made his debut in the Italian Superstars Championship with an Audi RS4 entered by Audi Sport Italia, finishing eleventh overall after taking part in the last four races; in the following two seasons he raced with the same team, finishing eighth in 2007 and twelfth in 2008, when he missed the final two races.

In 2009 he took part in the Italian CSAI GT Cup on board a Ferrari 430 entered by the Kessel Racing team. In the same year he won the 6 Hours of Bogotá on board a Ferrari 430 and a Radical. Driving two separate cars he won the race in two different categories and finished first and second in the overall ranking.

In 2010 he raced in the European championship Trofeo Maserati and finished second overall alongside Peter Sundberg.

In 2011 he competed in the International GT Sprint Series on board a Ferrari 430 with Spanish teammate Antonio de la Reina; they won the GTS Cup Trophy. In 2012 he raced both a Lamborghini Gallardo and a Porsche 997; Goldstein claimed again the trophy, this time by a margin of 4 points. In 2013, for the third year in a row, he was first in the standings again paired with de la Reina.

In 2014 he competed in the Italian GT Championship first division on board a Lamborghini Gallardo, finishing second in the Pirelli Tyres Cup standings.

In 2015, there was news that Goldstein was joining the Formula One as test driver for the Force India team.

References

External links

Colombian racing drivers
Bocconi University alumni
Living people
Superstars Series drivers
1981 births
Audi Sport drivers